KTZU (94.9 FM, "94.9 The Zoo") is radio station with a classic rock format. Licensed to Velva, North Dakota, it serves the Minot, North Dakota area. KTZU began transmission in April 2005, and broadcasts The Bob and Tom Show during the mornings. Its studios are located at 624 31st Ave. SW in Minot, and the transmitter site is south of town off of Highway 83.

KTZU's owner, Programmer's Broadcasting, also owns KWGO 102.9 (Country) in Burlington and KBTO 101.9 (country) in Bottineau.

Notable public service efforts have included "Are You Tough Enough to Wear Pink?", a 2007 campaign rallying the rodeo and western industry to raise money and awareness for breast cancer treatment and research. The campaign ultimately raised over $26,000 for a new cancer exercise rehabilitation center at the Minot Family YMCA.

References

External links
Station website

TZU
Radio stations established in 2005
Classic rock radio stations in the United States